

The population of Chad has numerous ethnic groups. SIL Ethnologue reports more than 130 distinct languages spoken in Chad.

History and demographics
The 14 million Chad people belong to some 200 ethnicities, who speak numerous languages. The peoples of Chad carry significant ancestry from Eastern, Central, Western, and Northern Africa. The population can be broadly divided between those in the east, north and west who follow Islam, and the peoples of the south, the five southernmost prefectures, who are mostly Christian or animist. The southern part of the country was historically the cross roads of the caravan routes below the Sahara, forming a link between West Africa and the Arabic region, as well as one between North Africa and sub-Saharan Africa. The slave trade between sub-Saharan Africa and the Middle East passed through the slave markets of Chad and Western Sudan, slave-trading was a key component of Chad's historic economy, and this brought people of various ethnicities into Chad. The CIA Factbook estimates the largest ethnic groups as of the 2014-2015 census as:

Other little-known ethnic groups believed to be living in Chad include the Kujarke people.

Muslim groups
Islamization began as early as the 8th century and was mostly complete by the 11th, when Islam became the official religion of the Kanem-Bornu Empire. The Shuwa established an economy of slave trade across the Sudan region, and in Chad there was a tradition of slave raids (ghazw) under the Ouaddai and Baguirmi which persisted well into the 20th century.

Muslim groups other than the Shuwa include the Toubou, Hadjerai, Fulbe/Fulani, Kotoko, Kanembou, Baguirmi, Boulala, Zaghawa, and Maba.

Non-Muslim groups

Language and ethnic groups
Ethno-linguistically, the groups may be divided into:
Chadian Arabic-speaking Shuwa
Chadic: Marba, Hausa, numerous minor groups
Nilo-Saharan: 
 Maban (Ouaddai)
 Saharan: Kanembu, Kanuri, Zaghawa, Toubou
Eastern Sudanic: Daju
Central Sudanic: Baguirmi, Sinyar
Niger-Congo: 
Bua
Atlantic-Congo: Fula people.

See also
List of ethnic groups in Chad
Languages of Chad
Demographics of Chad

References

 
Chad